Milanlu-ye Sofla (also Romanized as Mīlānlū-ye Soflá; also known as Mīlānlū-ye Pā’īn and Mīlānlū Pā’īn) is a village in Jirestan Rural District, Sarhad District, Shirvan County, North Khorasan Province, Iran. At the 2006 census, its population was 94, in 21 families.

References 

Populated places in Shirvan County